Hopewell is an unincorporated community in Pratt County, Kansas, United States.  It lies at an elevation of 2044 feet (624 m).  It is located northwest of Pratt.

History
A post office was opened in Hopewell in 1904, and remained in operation until it was discontinued in 1973. However, the post office was officially called Fravel from 1916 until 1921.

References

Further reading

External links
 Pratt County maps: Current, Historic, KDOT

 

Unincorporated communities in Pratt County, Kansas
Unincorporated communities in Kansas